Era High School or Era School is a public high school located in unincorporated Era, Texas (USA). It is part of the Era Independent School District located in southwest Cooke County and classified as a 2A school by the UIL. In 2015, the school was rated "Met Standard" by the Texas Education Agency.

Athletics
The Era Hornets compete in the following sports:

 Baseball
 Basketball
 Cross Country
 Football
 Golf
 Softball
 Tennis
 Track and Field

State Titles
Boys Track 
1914(B)
2016(2A)

References

External links
Era ISD

High schools in Cooke County, Texas
Public high schools in Texas
Public middle schools in Texas
Public elementary schools in Texas